Sarah Horn Elmaleh is an American voice actor. She has voice roles in the indie video games Gone Home (2013) and Where the Water Tastes Like Wine (2018) and AAA titles such as Final Fantasy XV (2016), For Honor (2017), and Anthem (2019). She became involved with union organizing, mainly with SAG-AFTRA, after her move to Los Angeles in 2015. In 2019, she founded the multilingual, online games conference gamedev.world with game developer Rami Ismail.

Early life 
Sarah Horn Elmaleh practiced dancing from the age of three until she was fourteen, when an injury led her to become involved in theater in high school. She attended Wesleyan University, located in Middletown, Connecticut, where she performed in radio dramas, which she felt drew on her childhood experiences of playing video games, especially adventure games by LucasArts and games by BioWare. She graduated in 2007.

Career 
Elmaleh performed in theater in New York for a few years after she graduated from university and found that auditions for voice-over roles were "less stressful and more fun, more playful, more casual" than other types of auditions. She also worked at Kill Screen magazine. Her credits for video game voice work go back to 2011. After she moved from Brooklyn to Los Angeles in 2015 to voice AAA video games, she became involved with union organizing in the video game industry. She has voice roles in the indie video games Gone Home (2013) and Where the Water Tastes Like Wine (2018), and the AAA titles Final Fantasy XV (2016) and For Honor (2017).

Elmaleh provided the voice of the female player character in BioWare's 2019 video game Anthem. A review by the National Post praised the game's acting, among other features, singling out Elmaleh's performance as "instantly likeable, infusing our hero with roguishness, confidence, friendliness and authentic wit." Before she was hired to work on the game, she provided the voices for characters in a mod of the BioWare-produced game Dragon Age: Origins. After allegations of Anthems protracted development timeline were reported after the game's release, in early 2019, Elmaleh spoke to Variety on the game's development and her favorable personal experiences during the process; she also said she was recording lines for a planned update to the game.

Union activities 
As a member of the labor union SAG-AFTRA, in 2015, Elmaleh voted in favor of strike action by video game voice actors against eleven video game developers and publishers to receive compensation through residuals in addition to other requests on working conditions. She participated in the strike, which began in October 2016, following failed contract negotiations with publishers through the previous year, and lasted until 2017. In late October 2018, the union released a contract which addressed the issues of compensation and working conditions for unionized voice actors, motion-capture performers, and singers, and also provided a way for actors to work on small game productions under the union. The agreement was developed through a two-year process led by voice actors including Elmaleh, Crispin Freeman, Jennifer Hale, and Courtenay Taylor. Elmaleh told Gamasutra at the time: "The only apprehension I had in joining the union was missing out on this whole burgeoning space of ambitious artistic expression. Coming out of indies and loving them, and not wanting to lose them as I scale up." Elmaleh voice acted under the new contract in the 2018 titles Where the Water Tastes Like Wine by Good Shepherd Entertainment and Exapunks by Zachtronics.

In 2018, Elmaleh, Jennifer Hale, and Cissy Jones created Specialized Workshops And Actor Tactics (SWAAT), a free service to improve video game scripts held with the Los Angeles-based company The Halp Network. Although actors involved with SWAAT were members of the SAG-AFTRA union, SWAAT did not require the game developer's project be under the union.

gamedev.world 
Elmaleh previously worked "game-maker relations" for the IndieCade games festival, a position in which she says she acted as the "single bottleneck" between the festival and participating game developers. She recalled meeting a game developer at her job who struggled to communicate with her in English, which motivated her to meet game developer Rami Ismail after reading a blog post by Ismail on language barriers in the video game industry. Ismail and Elmaleh eventually organized the online, multilingual games conference gamedev.world in 2019, supported by an advisory board made from Gwen Frey, Houssem Ben Amor and Gabriel Dal Santo, in order to "diversify" the video game industry. The conference features a series of presentations by developers broadcast with closed captioning and translations in eight languages. It followed an initial showcase of the format organized by Ismail and Elmaleh for the 2015 Games for Change Festival held in New York City.

Personal life 
On her personal website, Elmaleh states that she identifies as "bi/pansexual and gender-expansive/genderqueer" and that her ethnicity is a combination of "English, German, French, Irish and French-Canadian, as well as 1/4 Moroccan (Sephardic Jewish) and 1/8 Japanese (yonsei)." Her father, Antonio Osato Elmaleh (1950–2020), was an investor and former restaurateur and film producer.

Voice-over filmography

References

External links 

Living people
American video game actresses
American voice actresses
American voice directors
21st-century American actresses
21st-century American Sephardic Jews
21st-century LGBT people
Place of birth missing (living people)
Year of birth missing (living people)
Women in the video game industry
American bisexual actors
American non-binary actors
Wesleyan University alumni